The White Bear Lake Area School District, abbreviated WBLAS, is a public school district located in Ramsey County, Minnesota. It provides academic and educational services to the cities of Birchwood, Gem Lake, Hugo, Lino Lakes, Little Canada, Maplewood, North Oaks, Vadnais Heights, White Bear Lake and White Bear Township. The District consists of nine elementary schools, two middle schools, a two-campus high school and an Area Learning Center. The District also provides programs such as three locations for early childhood (birth-5), transition plus (special education 18-21) community services and senior programs. The school district covers a population of approximately 50,000 residents and provides services for nearly 9,000 students ranging from early childhood education to high school graduation to adult education and senior programs.

White Bear Lake Area Schools 

The District was recognized as a Top Performer in 2012 from the EPA for their portfolio of energy efficient buildings. Additionally, the White Bear Lake Area Educational Foundation works with the district to support instruction by providing grants for new projects.

Elementary schools 

There are nine neighborhood elementary schools in the White Bear Lake Area School District. The schools offer   art lessons from professional artists through the White Bear Center for the Arts, water safety lessons through the YMCA, and nature experiences in cooperation with regional nature centers. World language experiences is also offered at all grades; two   schools offer Chinese, seven   offer Spanish. Matoska International IB World School offers an International Baccalaureate Primary Years Program. A gifted program is also offered.

Middle schools 

White Bear Lake Area middle schools, Central Middle School and Sunrise Park Middle School, offer world language and fine arts opportunities at each grade level,. Both   are International Baccalaureate Candidate Schools for the Middle Years Program and in 2024 sunrise will move to south campus and be come mariner middle school(MYP).

White Bear Lake Area High School 
White Bear Lake Area High School has a two-campus structure: WBLAHS - North Campus and WBLAHS - South Campus. WBLAHS's two-campus structure provides a wide range of opportunities available in a large school combined in a small faculty-student mentoring ratio. The students can choose from over 30 college-level course offerings through the University of Minnesota's College in the Schools (CIS), Advanced Placement (AP) and the University of Minnesota's Project Lead the Way (STEM) courses.

Special education 

WBLAS's special education department offers individualized and comprehensive programs of  instruction for students with special needs. The district also participates in a special education cooperative district, which serves students with special needs.

Extra-curricular 

Hundreds of WBLAS students are recognized each year for state- and national-level participation and accomplishments. The district's youth development programs have gained both state and national attention.

Stewardship 

White Bear Lake Area Schools has received Excellence in Financial Reporting awards from both the Association of School Business Officials and the Government Finance Officers Association for 13 consecutive years.

References 

Education in Ramsey County, Minnesota
School districts in Minnesota